The Journal of the American Society of Naval Engineers was a journal published by the American Society of Naval Engineers between 1889 and 1962. Some volumes are available online through Google Books.

External links 
 Journal of the American Society of Naval Engineers at the Online Computer Library Center.
 

Publications established in 1889
1889 establishments in the United States
English-language journals
Publications disestablished in 1962
Engineering journals